Afraid of Sunlight is Marillion's eighth studio album, released in 1995. It was their last for EMI (who would, however, continue to release back-catalogue material on compilations and re-issues, as well as distribute some later recordings).

Afraid of Sunlight was the first Marillion studio album to fail to reach the Top 10 in the UK Albums Chart, peaking at number 16 and falling out of the Top 75 after two weeks. Despite this, Afraid of Sunlight became one of the band's most critically acclaimed albums and was included in Q magazines "Recordings of the Year" for 1995. It was retrospectively described by Jeri Montesano of Allmusic as "the peak of Marillion's growing, impressive body of work" and by colleague Jason Ankeny as "the most consistent Marillion release to date".

Concept
Although not a concept album as such, Afraid of Sunlight repeatedly examines the destructive side of celebrity. In particular, "Gazpacho" lampoons the Hollywood lifestyle and seems to refer to O. J. Simpson. "Cannibal Surf Babe" is a Beach Boys pastiche inspired by late-night horror movies. "Out of This World" is dedicated to world land and water speed record holder Donald Campbell, killed in 1967, and inspired diver Bill Smith to look for the wreck. The main wreckage of Campbell's Bluebird K7 hydroplane was recovered from Coniston Water on 8 March 2001. Both Steve Hogarth and Steve Rothery were present at the raising. The title track refers to self-destructive thrill-seekers such as James Dean, while "King" is about Elvis Presley, Kurt Cobain and Michael Jackson. "Beyond You" is reminiscent of Phil Spector's Wall of Sound productions and was mixed in mono.

One reviewer noted the 1980 Martin Scorsese film Raging Bull, about a boxer's inability to deal with fame, as a strong influence on the album. He also cited O. J. Simpson, on trial for murder at the time Afraid of Sunlight was recorded, as another influence on its concept; the wind-down of "Gazpacho" ends with a sample from a news report on Simpson's infamous flight from the police.

Release
Afraid of Sunlight was released in Europe on 24 June 1995 by EMI Records on CD, LP and cassette, and in the U.S. on 4 July 1995 by El Dorado, a subsidiary label of I.R.S. Records. It climbed to number 16 in the UK and spent only three weeks in the charts, the shortest chart residency of any Marillion studio album by then. The only single from the album, "Beautiful", peaked at number 29 in the UK Singles Chart. Afraid of Sunlight reached number 8 in the Netherlands, the country where the band has one of their largest fanbases.

As part of a series of Marillion's first eight studio albums, EMI Records re-released Afraid of Sunlight on 22 March 1999 with 24-bit digital remastered sound and a second disc containing bonus tracks. A new 180g heavy weight vinyl pressing identical to the original 1995 edition was released in 2013.

Critical reception

AllMusic critic Alex S. Garcia has retrospectively given Afraid of Sunlight a four-out-of-five star rating. He noted that the album has "some very beautiful melodic moments and perhaps a better mix between calm and  melodies than on previous albums made with Steve Hogarth". Jeri Montesano called it "the peak of Marillion's growing, impressive body of work" while reviewing Seasons End (1989). His colleague Dale Jensen has named the album "the most consistent Marillion release to date". In a review from Q magazine, Afraid of Sunlight has been described as "a 40-minute journey that touches on the legacy of Brian Wilson, Todd Rundgren and The Beatles, while hinting at the experimental trivialities of Jellyfish or Split Enz".

Track listing

Tracks 3-9 of the 1999 remastered edition bonus disc had previously been unreleased.

4-CD + Blu-ray Disc, 2019, Remixed, Digi-BookCD 1 Michael Hunter 2019 RemixCD 2 Original 1995 Dave Meegan MixTracklisting for discs 1 and 2 as aboveCD 3 Live At The Ahoy, Rotterdam (29 September 1995) Intro (Skater's Waltz)	0:47
 Incommunicado	4:56 
 Hooks In You	2:59 
 Gazpacho	6:16 
 Icon	1:11 
 Beautiful	5:33 
 Hotel Hobbies	2:04 
 White Russian	7:09 
 Easter	6:11 
 Mad	2:52 
 The Opium Den	3:48 
 Hard As Love	6:34 
 The Hollow Man	5:14CD 4 Live At The Ahoy, Rotterdam (29 September 1995)  Kayleigh	4:09 
  Lavender	4:19 
  Afraid Of Sunlight	6:57 
  Cannibal Surf Babe	4:51 
  Cover My Eyes	4:15 
  Slainte Mhath	4:45 
  King	7:20 
  Splintering Heart	7:20 
  No One Can	5:36 
  The Great Escape	5:46 
  Uninvited Guest	4:27 
  Garden Party	7:38Blu-ray Disc'

2019 Michael Hunter remix in stereo and 5.1 surround
  Gazpacho		
  Cannibal Surf Babe		
  Beautiful		
  Afraid Of Sunrise		
  Out Of This World		
  Afraid Of Sunlight		
  Beyond You		
  King		

Bonus Tracks
  Ascending Synth Groove		
  Velvet Lawn		
  Building Guitar		
  Band Of Gold		
  Gazpacho [Early Version]		
  Sufer Bass		
  Cannibal Surf [Early Version]		
  Beautiful [Early Version]		
  Kd Lang		
  Out Of This World [Early Version]		
  Afraid Of Sunlight [Early Version]		
  Beyond You [Early Version]		
  Crunchy Guitar Idea		
  Deep Purple Vibe		
  Watery Guitar		
  King [Early Version]		
  Happy Accidents		
  Afraid Of Sunlight		
  Beautiful		
  Icon	
  Live Forever	
  Second Chance	
  Beyond You [Demo]	
  Cannibal Surf Babe	
  Out Of This World	
  Bass Frenzy	
  Mirages [Demo]	
  Afraid Of Sunlight [Acoustic Demo]

Personnel
Marillion
Steve Hogarth – vocals, additional keyboards and percussion
Steve Rothery – guitar
Mark Kelly – keyboards
Pete Trewavas – bass and backing vocals
Ian Mosley – drums and percussion

Additional musicians
Barbara Lezmy – additional backing vocals (on "Cannibal Surf Babe")
Wendy Paige – additional backing vocals (on "Cannibal Surf Babe")
Hannah Stobart – additional backing vocals (on "Beautiful")

Technical personnel
Dave Meegan – production, engineering and mixing (at Parr Street Studios, Liverpool, England)
Nick Davis – mixing ("Cannibal Surf Babe") (at Rockfield Studios, Monmouthshire, Wales)
Michael Brauer – mixing ("Beautiful") (at Sony Music Studios, New York)
Peter Mew – 1999 digital remastering (January 1999 at Abbey Road Studios, London)
Bill Smith Studio – design
Paul Cox – front cover photography

Charts

References
Notes

Citations

External links
The Official Marillion Website

Marillion albums
1995 albums
EMI Records albums
Albums produced by Dave Meegan